Sumitrosis is a genus of leaf beetles in the family Chrysomelidae. There are at least 60 described species in Sumitrosis.

Species
 Sumitrosis amica (Baly, 1885)
 Sumitrosis ancoroides (Schaeffer, 1933)
 Sumitrosis annulipes (Pic, 1932)
 Sumitrosis bifasciata (Pic, 1929)
 Sumitrosis binotaticollis (Pic, 1929)
 Sumitrosis bondari (Uhmann, 1953)
 Sumitrosis brevenotata (Pic, 1929)
 Sumitrosis breviceps (Baly, 1885)
 Sumitrosis bruchi (Uhmann, 1938)
 Sumitrosis chacoensis (Uhmann, 1938)
 Sumitrosis championi (Weise, 1911)
 Sumitrosis congener (Baly, 1885)
 Sumitrosis curta (Pic, 1929)
 Sumitrosis difficilis (Monrós and Viana, 1947)
 Sumitrosis distinctus (Baly, 1885)
 Sumitrosis diversipes (Baly, 1885)
 Sumitrosis flavipennis (Weise, 1910)
 Sumitrosis fryi (Baly, 1885)
 Sumitrosis fuscicornis (Weise, 1910)
 Sumitrosis germaini (Pic, 1929)
 Sumitrosis gestroi (Weise, 1906)
 Sumitrosis heringi (Uhmann, 1935)
 Sumitrosis imparallela (Pic, 1932)
 Sumitrosis inaequalis (Weber, 1801)
 Sumitrosis instabilis (Baly, 1885)
 Sumitrosis lateapicalis (Pic, 1934)
 Sumitrosis latior (Pic, 1932)
 Sumitrosis lebasi (Chapuis, 1877)
 Sumitrosis lepidula (Weise, 1905)
 Sumitrosis maculata (Uhmann, 1931)
 Sumitrosis marginella (Weise, 1905)
 Sumitrosis minima (Pic, 1932)
 Sumitrosis minuta (Pic, 1932)
 Sumitrosis obidosensis (Pic, 1929)
 Sumitrosis obliterata (Chapuis, 1877)
 Sumitrosis obscura (Chapuis, 1877)
 Sumitrosis octostriata (Chapuis, 1877)
 Sumitrosis opacicollis (Baly, 1885)
 Sumitrosis pallescens (Baly, 1885)
 Sumitrosis parallela (Champion, 1894)
 Sumitrosis peruana (Pic, 1929)
 Sumitrosis picta (Weise, 1910)
 Sumitrosis placida (Baly, 1885)
 Sumitrosis pretiosula (Uhmann, 1961)
 Sumitrosis regularis (Weise, 1905)
 Sumitrosis reichardti (Uhmann, 1968)
 Sumitrosis replexa (Uhmann, 1931)
 Sumitrosis rosea (Weber, 1801) (leafminer beetle)
 Sumitrosis semilimbata (Baly, 1885)
 Sumitrosis signifera (Weise, 1905)
 Sumitrosis steinheili (Chapuis, 1877)
 Sumitrosis subangulata (Chapuis, 1877)
 Sumitrosis terminatus (Baly, 1885)
 Sumitrosis tesseraria (Weise, 1905)
 Sumitrosis testacea (Pic, 1934)
 Sumitrosis tibialis (Baly, 1885)
 Sumitrosis trinidadica (Uhmann, 1950)
 Sumitrosis triplehorni
 Sumitrosis varians (Uhmann, 1961)
 Sumitrosis weisei Staines, 1993
 Sumitrosis weyrauchi (Uhmann, 1968)

References

 Riley, Edward G., Shawn M. Clark, and Terry N. Seeno (2003). "Catalog of the leaf beetles of America north of Mexico (Coleoptera: Megalopodidae, Orsodacnidae and Chrysomelidae, excluding Bruchinae)". Coleopterists Society Special Publication no. 1, 290.
 Staines, C. L. (2002). "The New World tribes and genera of hispines (Coleoptera: Chrysomelidae: Cassidinae)". Proceedings of the Entomological Society of Washington, vol. 104, no. 3, 721–784.

Further reading

 Arnett, R. H. Jr., M. C. Thomas, P. E. Skelley and J. H. Frank. (eds.). (21 June 2002). American Beetles, Volume II: Polyphaga: Scarabaeoidea through Curculionoidea. CRC Press LLC, Boca Raton, Florida .
 Arnett, Ross H. (2000). American Insects: A Handbook of the Insects of America North of Mexico. CRC Press.
 Richard E. White. (1983). Peterson Field Guides: Beetles. Houghton Mifflin Company.

Cassidinae